Diocese of Rutana may refer to the following ecclesiastical jurisdictions:
 Roman Catholic Diocese of Rutana (f. 2009), Burundi
 Anglican Diocese of Rutana (f. 2017), Burundi